This is a list of the heads of state of the Republic of China (ROC) since 1912 and the People's Republic of China (PRC) since 1949.

List of presidents of the Republic (since 1912) 

This is a list of the presidents of the Republic of China (ROC) (1912–present). The Republic of China president is called 總統 (Zǒngtǒng, "President"), and from 1912–1928, 大總統 (Dàzǒngtǒng, "Grand President").

Since 1949, the de facto territory of the ROC is reduced to Taiwan and its surrounding islands, the former previously ruled by Japan from 1895 to 1945, no longer governing mainland China. It continued to represent China in the United Nations until it was expelled on 25 October 1971 and diplomatically by the United States government until 1 January 1979. The President of the ROC is also known as the President of Taiwan due to the territory it governs.

All the names on this list follow the Oriental convention with the family name first and given name second.

 Presidents of the Provisional Government
 period: 1 January 1912 – 10 October 1913

 Presidents of the Beiyang government
 period: 10 October 1913 – 2 June 1928

 Chairmen of the Nationalist Government
 period: 7 February 1928 – 20 May 1948

The head of state of the Nationalist Government (國民政府) in this period (political tutelage,  訓政時期).

Presidents under the 1947 Constitution
 period: 20 May 1948 – 20 May 1996
The Government of the Republic of China was defeated in the Chinese civil war. With the communist regime declared on Mainland China in October 1949, the de facto territory of the Republic was reduced to Taiwan and its outlying islands and two counties of Fukien Province.

 Presidents after the introduction of Direct Election
 period: 20 May 1996 – present

List of presidents of the People's Republic (since 1949)

This is a list of all the chairmen of the People's Republic of China (1954–1975) and the presidents of the People's Republic of China (1982–present).  The President of the PRC is called 主席 (zhǔxí), formerly translated as Chairman.

To avoid confusion, all the names on this list follow the Oriental convention (family name first, given name second) for consistency.

 Generations of leadership

Central People's Government under the Common Program (1949–1954) 
 Chairman of the Central People's Government
 Mao Zedong (1 October 1949 – 27 September 1954)

The 1st Constitution (1954–1975) 
 Chairman/Chairwoman of the People's Republic China

The 2nd Constitution (1975–1978) 

 Chairman/Chairwoman of the Standing Committee of the 4th National People's Congress
 Zhu De (17 January 1975 – 6 July 1976) died in office
 Soong Ching-ling (6 July 1976 – 5 March 1978) acting
 Ye Jianying (5 March 1978 – 5 March 1978)

The 3rd Constitution (1978–1982) 

 Chairman of the Standing Committee of the 5th National People's Congress
 Ye Jianying (5 March 1978 – 18 June 1983)

 Honorary President of the People's Republic China

The 4th Constitution (1982–present)
President of the People's Republic China

Notes

References 

President
Presidents 02
China
Presidents 02
Presidents 02
Presidents 02
Lists of leaders of China
Presidents